Cynoglossus quadrilineatus, the fourlined tonguesole, is a species of tonguefish native to the Indian Ocean from Pakistan to the western Pacific Ocean where it occurs from Japan to northern Australia. This species can reach a length of  SL though most do not exceed  SL. It is important in local commercial fisheries.

Taxonomic revision
This species was previously known as C. bilineatus (Lacépède, 1802), however research by Maurice Kottelat has determined that Lacépède's description of Achirus bilineatus (later moved to genus Cynoglossus) was taken from materials that derived directly from Bloch's description of Pleuronectes bilineatus and thus renders Lacépède's A. bilineatus and thus C. bilineatus as junior synonyms of Bloch's Pl. bilineatus (now Paraplagusia bilineatus).  Thus the earliest available name for this particular species becomes Bleeker's Plagusia quadrilineata.

References

Cynoglossidae
Taxa named by Pieter Bleeker 
Fish described in 1851